Frédérique Heligon (born 27 February 1970) is a French rower. She competed in the women's coxless four event at the 1992 Summer Olympics.

References

External links
 

1970 births
Living people
French female rowers
Olympic rowers of France
Rowers at the 1992 Summer Olympics
Sportspeople from Nantes